Governor Cuomo may refer to one of the following Governors of New York:

 Mario Cuomo (1932–2015), 52nd Governor (1983–1994)
 Andrew Cuomo (born 1957), 56th Governor (2011–2021); son of Mario Cuomo

See also
 Cuomo, surname
 Cuomo (disambiguation)